Colton Hunchak (born September 25, 1997) is a professional Canadian football wide receiver for the Calgary Stampeders of the Canadian Football League (CFL). He was drafted with the last selection, 73rd overall, in the 2019 CFL Draft by the Stampeders and signed with the team on May 13, 2019. He played U Sports football for the York Lions from 2015 to 2018.

Professional career
Hunchak played in 28 games in his first two seasons catching 16 passes in both seasons, for a combined total of 478 yards. He re-signed with the Calgary Stampeders on January 6, 2021. In his third season in the league Hunchak  played in 14 games and contributed with six receptions for 69 yards. Hunchak and the Stampeders agreed to another contract extension on December 15, 2022.

References

External links
 Calgary Stampeders bio

1997 births
Living people
Canadian football wide receivers
York Lions football players
Calgary Stampeders players
Players of Canadian football from Alberta
Canadian football people from Calgary